Oncocera semirubella is a small moth of the family Pyralidae. It is found in European regions, including the British Isles, and East Asia (e.g. China, Japan, South Korea and Taiwan).

The wingspan is 26–30 mm. The adult moth flies in one generation from the end of June to August. It is easily disturbed from short grassland, flies from dusk onwards, and is attracted to light and sugar.

The larvae feed on bird's-foot trefoil (Lotus corniculatus), white clover, Ononis species, horseshoe vetch and Medicago species.

Notes
The flight season refers to Belgium and the Netherlands; this may vary in other parts of its range.

References

External links

 waarneming.nl 
 Lepidoptera of Belgium 
 UKmoths

Phycitini
Moths described in 1763
Moths of Europe
Moths of Japan
Taxa named by Giovanni Antonio Scopoli